(born March 11, 1972), simply known by the stage name Ua, is a Japanese singer. She made her debut under Speedstar Records in 1995 with the single "Horizon".

Biography 
Ua was born Kaori Shima and grew up in Suita, Osaka. After graduating from Saga University of Arts in Kyoto, she worked as a lounge singer in her hometown. There in 1994, she was scouted by producer Hiroshi Fujiwara. She took on the unusual stage name of Ua (a Swahili word that means both "flower" and "kill") and made her debut with the Fujiwara-produced "Horizon". Her fourth single "Jōnetsu" became a smash hit and Ua was recognized all over Japan.

After releasing her first album, 11, Ua married actor Jun Murakami and gave birth to a son, Nijirō, in 1997, who is also an actor. The couple divorced in 2006. In 2000, after two more albums, Ametora and Turbo, Ua took a hiatus from her solo work and formed the band Ajico with Kenichi Asai. She resumed her solo activities in 2002 and released her fourth album, Dorobō. The same year she made her acting debut as the leading role in the film Mizu no Onna, as well as contributing to the soundtrack. The film went on to win the Golden Alexander prize for Best Feature-Length Film at the International Thessaloniki Film Festival and was screened at the 2003 Cannes Film Festival.

In 2003, Ua released Illuminate: The Very Best Songs, her first compilation album. In April that year, she expanded her activities by becoming the hostess named ううあ (the pronunciation remains the same since it is meant to be a phonetic representation of her usual stagename) of an educational TV program on NHK called Do Re Mi no TV, designed to pass along Japanese traditional songs to children. Utauua, a compilation of the songs performed, was released in 2004. The same year she released her fifth album, Sun, which was mastered by Ted Jensen. In 2005, she released her sixth album, Breathe, and a compilation album of collaborations titled Nephews to mark her 10th anniversary. In 2006, Ua collaborated with renowned jazz musician Naruyoshi Kikuchi on the album Cure Jazz. In 2007, in addition to releasing her seventh album Golden Green, Ua made a second foray into acting by appearing in Hitoshi Matsumoto's directorial debut Dai Nipponjin.

In 2008, Ua revealed that she married again and gave birth to a daughter, in August. In December, she released the single "2008", followed by her eighth album, Atta, in July 2009. In April 2010, Ua released her fourth live album, entitled Haluto Live.

In September 2010, her combined house and studio in Sagamihara accidentally burned down; no one was injured.

Discography 

11 (1996)
Ametora (1998)
Turbo (1999)
Dorobō (2002)
Sun (2004)
Breathe (2005)
Golden Green (2007)
Atta (2009)
JaPo (2016)

Filmography

References

External links 

1972 births
Living people
People from Suita
Musicians from Osaka Prefecture
Japanese women pop singers
Japanese women singer-songwriters
20th-century Japanese women singers
20th-century Japanese singers
21st-century Japanese women singers
21st-century Japanese singers